Philip Kim is a South Korean physicist. He is a condensed matter physicist known for study of quantum transport in carbon nanotubes and graphene, including observations of quantum Hall effects in graphene.

Academic career
Kim studied physics at Seoul National University and earned his bachelor's degree in 1990 and a master's degree in 1992, and a doctorate in applied physics at Harvard University in 1999 under the supervision of Charles Lieber. He worked at the University of California, Berkeley as a Miller Research Fellow until 2001, when he joined the faculty at Columbia University where much of his seminal work was carried out. He later moved to Harvard University in 2014 as a Professor of Physics and Applied Physics.

Research
Kim and coworkers have made important contributions in the field of nanoscale low-dimensional materials. In 1999, he and Lieber published a highly cited paper on electrostatically controlled carbon nanotube NEMS devices. In Feb. 2005, his group at Columbia reported electrical measurements of thin graphite films produced by an atomic force microscope technique.
In Sept. 2005, they reported observation of the quantum Hall effect in single graphene layers simultaneously with the group of Andre Geim, and in 2007, the two groups jointly published observations of the quantum Hall effect in graphene at room temperature. Kim's group authored an influential paper in 2007 describing a transport gap introduced by lithographic patterning of graphene to form nanoribbons. This was an important proof of principle in the development of graphene electronics as it allowed on-off switching of the graphene devices by a factor of 1000  at low temperature. In Feb. 2009, his group and coworkers have synthesized the large-scale graphene films by CVD method. He indicated that the quality of CVD-grown graphene is comparable to that of mechanically cleaved graphene, as observation of the half-integer quantum Hall effect in CVD-grown graphene. The group reported observation of the fractional quantum Hall effect in suspended graphene in Nov. 2009.

Honors and awards
Kim received a National Science Foundation Early Career Development Award in 2004. In 2006, he was named as one of the "Scientific American 50", a list of individuals/organizations honored for their contributions to science and society during the preceding year. Kim was awarded the 2008 Ho-Am Prize in Science "for his pioneering work on low-dimensional carbon nanostructures".  He received an IBM Faculty award in 2009. In 2011, Kim won the Dresden Barkhausen Award.
In his Nobel Prize lecture, Andre Geim acknowledged the contribution of Philip Kim, saying, "I owe Philip a great deal for this, and many people heard me saying – before and after the Nobel Prize – that I would be honored to share it with him."

References

External links
 

Living people
Year of birth missing (living people)
Columbia University faculty
Experimental physicists
Condensed matter physicists
Harvard University alumni
Harvard University faculty
Recipients of the Ho-Am Prize in Science
Seoul National University alumni
South Korean physicists
University of California, Berkeley fellows
Oliver E. Buckley Condensed Matter Prize winners
Fellows of the American Physical Society